The Lurgan Park Rally was an annual rally event held in Lurgan Park in Lurgan, Northern Ireland from 1980 to 2016. In 2010, the rally was given a new logo and another new logo was released for the 2012 rally. The Rally also held the Escort Mk2 Challenge. It was the largest single rally venue on the island of Ireland.

History

The Lurgan Park Rally began in 1980 in a rally won by the late Bertie Fisher. The rally almost folded before the 2009 rally because of no main sponsor when Turkington backed out but was saved by Orchard Motorsport. Unlike Rallies in the Irish Tarmac Rally Championship and other rallies in Northern Ireland, it wasn't cancelled during the 2001 Foot and Mouth disease crisis. Mark Higgins finished second in 2004, 2007 and 2008, behind Kevin Lynch. Lynch holds the record for most consecutive victories with 5 from 2004 to 2008, whilst Kenny McKinstry holds the record for most wins with 11. The last rally was held in 2016, it was announced in March 2017 that the 2017 rally would not go ahead.

Sponsors

Main sponsor
Burmah 1990-1995
Seat 1996-2002
Triton Showers 2003-2005
Turkington 2006-2008
Orchard Motorsport 2009–2016

Other sponsors

Armagh City, Banbridge & Craigavon Borough Council
Roadside Motors
Citroën
KDM Hire
Rushmere Shopping Centre

Coverage

TV
RPM held the television rights for the Lurgan Park Rally, which aired on UTV in Northern Ireland.

Winners

1980	Bertie Fisher / David Johnston	
1981	Bertie Fisher / Roy Cathcart
1982	John Lyons / William Singleton	
1983	Kenny McKinstry / Kevin Doyle
1984	Bertie Law / Bobby Campbell	
1985	Kenny McKinstry / Brian McNamee
1986	Mikael Sundstrom / Richard Young	
1987	Kenny McKinstry / John McGaffin
1988	Kenny McKinstry / John McGaffin	
1989	Gwyndaf Evans / Howard Davies
1990	Kenny Colbert / Eric Patterson	
1991	Tony Pond / Don Wilmont
1992	Kenny McKinstry / Robbie Philpott	
1993	Kenny McKinstry / Robbie Philpott
1994	Kenny McKinstry / Robbie Philpott	
1995	David Greer / Michael Reid
1996	Kenny McKinstry / Pamela Ballantine	
1997	Gwyndaf Evans / John McIlroy
1998	Patrick Snijers / Willie McKee	
1999	Gwyndaf Evans / Howard Davies
2000	Kenny McKinstry / Noel Orr	
2001	Gwyndaf Evans / Gary Savage
2002	Dom Buckley / Dougie Redpath	
2003	Kenny McKinstry / Noel Orr
2004	Kevin Lynch / Francis Regan	
2005	Kevin Lynch / Gordon Noble
2006	Kevin Lynch / Francis Regan	
2007	Kevin Lynch / Francis Regan
2008	Kevin Lynch / Francis Regan	
2009	Kenny McKinstry / John Skinner
2010	Darren Gass / Nathan Gass
2011	Darren Gass / Kerrie Gass
2012   Kris Meeke / Gerry McVeigh
2013   Garry Jennings / Michael Moran
2014   Garry Jennings / Michael Moran
2015   Garry Jennings / Michael Moran
2016   Garry Jennings / Michael Moran

Owing to his number of wins, Kenny McKinstry has earned the title King of the Park.

References

External links
 Lurgan Park official site

Rally competitions in the United Kingdom
Motorsport in Northern Ireland
Lurgan
Sport in County Armagh